Amir Reza Vaezi-Ashtiani is an Iranian conservative politician. He served a Tehran councilor from 2003 to 2007 and was formerly head of Iranian cycling federation and Esteghlal club.

References

External links 
 Bloomberg profile

Iranian football chairmen and investors
Living people
Alliance of Builders of Islamic Iran politicians
Islamic Republican Party politicians
Islamic Coalition Party politicians
Tehran Councillors 2003–2007
Coalition of the Pleasant Scent of Servitude politicians
Year of birth missing (living people)